Krasnaya Nov was a Soviet monthly literary magazine.

History 
Krasnaya Nov, the first Soviet "thick" literary magazine, was established in June 1921. In its first 7 years, under editor-in-chief Alexander Voronsky, it reached a circulation of 15,000 copies, publishing works of the leading Soviet authors, including Maxim Gorky, Vladimir Mayakovsky, and Sergey Yesenin, as well as essays on politics, economics, and science by authors like Lenin, Stepanov-Skvortsov, Bukharin, Frunze and Radek, among others. 
In 1927, Voronsky was condemned as a Trotskyist and fired. He was replaced first by an editorial board consisting of Vladimir Vasilyevsky, Vladimir Fritsche and Fyodor Raskolnikov (summer 1927–spring 1929), then chief editor Fyodor Raskolnikov (1929–1930), Ivan Bespalov (1930–1931), and Alexander Fadeyev (1931–1942), the latter bringing the circulation figures up to 45,000. In late 1941 the magazine was evacuated and in 1942 it closed for good.

Krasnaya Nov had its own publishing house of the same name. Among its publications was Trotsky's brochure "New Course".

References

1921 establishments in Russia
1942 disestablishments in the Soviet Union
Defunct literary magazines published in Europe
Magazines published in the Soviet Union
Eastern Bloc mass media
Magazines established in 1921
Magazines disestablished in 1942
Magazines published in Moscow
Monthly magazines published in Russia
Russian-language magazines
Literary magazines published in the Soviet Union